Shulgan-Tash Nature Reserve (also Shulgan-Tash) is a Russian 'zapovednik' (strict nature reserve) in the western foothills of the Southern Ural Mountains.  The terrain is one of heavy forest and karst topography; the site contains some of the oldest caves of human habitation (Kapova Cave).   The reserve has 13 full-time "bortniks" - practitioners of the ancient apiculture (bee-keeping) of tree-hollow cultivation of wild honeybees.  The reserve is situated in the Burzyansky District of Bashkortostan.  It is about 40 km southeast of the District town of Starosubkhangulovo.  In 2012, the reserve was added to the UNESCO Biosphere Reserve "Bashkir Ural", in particular for protection of the Burzyuan bee, which has been cultivated since ancient times by the local Bashkir people.

Topography
The Shulgan-Tash Reserve terrain consists of low-lying foothills (100 - 300 meter ridges, dissected by river and stream valleys); the overall altitude range in the reserve is 240 – 700 meters.  The cover is over 90% light-coniferous-deciduous forests; the remainder is small sectors of mountain steppes and meadows.  Bashkiriya National Park is to the west and south, and Shulgan-Tash includes the Altyn-Solok Entymological Reserve.  The Nugush River and Belaya River flow through the reserve.

The most famous of the limestone caves in the reserve is "Shulgan-Tash (Kapova)", which is known for cave exploration (over 3 km of halls and galleries), over 200 ancient cave paintings (dated to 14-17 century BCE), and as an ethnographic site of importance to the local Bashkiris.  The paintings feature mammoths, horses, geometric shapes, complex characters, and anthropomorphic figures.  Inside the cave is an underground river (the "Shulgan").

Climate and ecoregion
Shulgan-Tash is located in the East European forest steppe ecoregion, a transition zone between the broadleaf forests of the north and the grasslands to the south. This ecoregion is characterized by a mosaic of forests, steppe, and riverine wetlands.

The climate of Shulgan-Tash is Humid continental climate, warm summer (Köppen climate classification (Dfb)). This climate is characterized by large swings in temperature, both diurnally and seasonally, with mild summers and cold, snowy winters.

Flora and fauna 
Shulgan-Tash is at the meeting zone of deciduous forests (the eastern edge of linden, oak, elm, and maple, with some oak on the southern slopes) and light-coniferous taiga (mostly pine).  Scientists on the reserve have recorded 877 species of vascular plants, 184 of mosses, 233 of lichens, 117 species of mushrooms, and 202 species of algae and cyanobacteria.  Of the vascular plants, about 10% are endemic, and 10 species of which are relic spruce and linden.

The animals are those typical of the mountain-forest meeting zone of European woods (such as mice), and representatives of the Siberian woods (hare, etc.)  Common large mammals are elk, bear, fox, and marten.  Scientists on the reserve have recorded 60 species of mammals.

The primary concern of the reserve is protect the gene pool of bees from cross-breeding with outside bees.  (Importation of bees is banned).  As domesticated bee colonies outside of the reserve suffer from in-breeding and other disorders, the Shulgan-Tash Reserve can provide a classic service of a 'reserve', exporting bees to strengthen outside stocks.

Ecoeducation and access
The Shulgan-Tash Reserve is one of the Russian Zapovedniks with relatively advanced tourist facilities; over 36,000 tourists visit the site each year.   There is a cave museum, an apiculture museum, equipped playground, parking facilities, apiary, observation platforms , a juice bar, and a souvenir shop (selling wild honey).   There are a number of 'ecotourist' routes in the reserve, mostly hiking trails to the observation sites, the cave, and the bee production site.  The main office is in the village of Irgizly.

See also 
 List of Russian Nature Reserves (class 1a 'zapovedniks')
 WikiCommons gallery: Kapova Cave

References

External links
  Map of Shulgan-Tash Reserve, OpenStreetMap
  Map of Shulgan-Tash Reserve, ProtectedPlanet

Nature reserves in Russia
Geography of Bashkortostan
Protected areas established in 1986
1986 establishments in Russia
Zapovednik